The Rijndael S-box is a substitution box (lookup table) used in the Rijndael cipher, on which the Advanced Encryption Standard (AES) cryptographic algorithm is based.

Forward S-box 

The S-box maps an 8-bit input, to an 8-bit output, . Both the input and output are interpreted as polynomials over GF(2). Zero, as the identity, is mapped to itself. This transformation is known as the Nyberg S-box after its inventor Kaisa Nyberg. The multiplicative inverse is then transformed using the following affine transformation:

This affine transformation is the sum of multiple rotations of the byte as a vector, where addition is the XOR operation:

where  represents the multiplicative inverse,  is the bitwise XOR operator,  is a left bitwise circular shift, and the constant  is given in hexadecimal.

An equivalent formulation of the affine transformation is
 

Another equivalent is:
 

Inverse S-box 

The inverse S-box is simply the S-box run in reverse.  For example, the inverse S-box of b8 is 9a. It is calculated by first calculating the inverse affine transformation of the input value, followed by the multiplicative inverse. The inverse affine transformation is as follows:

The inverse affine transformation also represents the sum of multiple rotations of the byte as a vector, where addition is the XOR operation:
 

where  is the bitwise XOR operator,  is a left bitwise circular shift, and the constant  is given in hexadecimal.

Design criteria 

The Rijndael S-box was specifically designed to be resistant to linear and differential cryptanalysis. This was done by minimizing the correlation between linear transformations of input/output bits, and at the same time minimizing the difference propagation probability.

The Rijndael S-box can be replaced in the Rijndael cipher, which defeats the suspicion of a backdoor built into the cipher that exploits a static S-box. The authors claim that the Rijndael cipher structure is likely to provide enough resistance against differential and linear cryptanalysis even if an S-box with "average" correlation / difference propagation properties is used (cf. the  "optimal" properties of the Rijndael S-box).

Example implementation in C language 

The following C code calculates the S-box:
#include <stdint.h>

#define ROTL8(x,shift) ((uint8_t) ((x) << (shift)) | ((x) >> (8 - (shift))))

void initialize_aes_sbox(uint8_t sbox[256]) {
	uint8_t p = 1, q = 1;
	
	/* loop invariant: p * q == 1 in the Galois field */
	do {
		/* multiply p by 3 */
		p = p ^ (p << 1) ^ (p & 0x80 ? 0x1B : 0);

		/* divide q by 3 (equals multiplication by 0xf6) */
		q ^= q << 1;
		q ^= q << 2;
		q ^= q << 4;
		q ^= q & 0x80 ? 0x09 : 0;

		/* compute the affine transformation */
		uint8_t xformed = q ^ ROTL8(q, 1) ^ ROTL8(q, 2) ^ ROTL8(q, 3) ^ ROTL8(q, 4);

		sbox[p] = xformed ^ 0x63;
	} while (p != 1);

	/* 0 is a special case since it has no inverse */
	sbox[0] = 0x63;
}

References 

Advanced Encryption Standard
Finite fields
S-box